Nieuwebrug ("New Bridge") is the name of several towns in the Netherlands:

 Nieuwebrug, North Holland in the Haarlemmermeer
 Nieuwebrug, Friesland
 Nieuwebrug, Overijssel